Lavr Dmitrievich Proskouriakov (18 August 1858, the village of Borisovka, Voronezh Governorate – 14 September 1926, Moscow) was one of the foremost authorities on bridge engineering and structural mechanics in the Russian empire and the early Soviet Union.

Life and career

Lavr Proskouriakov was born on 18 August, 1858 into a large peasant family. In 1884, he graduated from the Saint-Petersburg Institute of Railway Engineers and began his career as a designer of bridges. Since 1887, he lectured at the same institute, and starting from 1896 Proskouriakov held the position of Full Professor at Moscow State University of Railway Engineering.

Even the early Proskouriakov's projects for bridges across the rivers Western Bug (1885) and Sula in the Ukrainian city of Romny (1887) attracted attention by their novelty and ingenuity. The drawings of those bridges were published by Professor L.F. Nikolai, the head of the bridge faculty at the Petersburg Institute of Railway Engineers, in his tutorial on bridge design for railway engineers.

In the summer of 1895, Proskouriakov was sent abroad by the decision of the Institute academic council for taking part in the International Railway Congress in London and exploring local mechanical laboratories and bridges. Besides London, he visited laboratories in Paris, Zurich, Munich, Vienna and Berlin and then went to the United States for getting acquainted with the biggest bridges and local mechanical laboratories.

Proskouriakov was the first in Europe, who rejected the widespread lattice girder design of trusses with many vertical and diagonal members that were extremely difficult for truss analysis. Instead, he designed a statically determinate triangular web truss with a minimum number of diagonals that provided a better distribution of the effects of moving loads on bridge structures.
 

The truss superstructure was composed of six spans. The piers were reinforced by starlings (cutwaters) pointing upstream to break up ice that floats downstream during the annual spring thaw.

When designing the bridge, Proskouriakov proposed a groundbreaking truss system. He also applied the theory of influence lines for truss analysis that enabled a more accurate calculation of internal forces in every member in a truss due moving loads on bridge structures. Since then, the theory of influence lines for truss analysis has been used in engineering both in Russia and around the world. Incidentally, the Yenisei bridge was the first in Russia, during the construction of which the incremental launching method was applied for the first time.

Thanks to its engineering and technical characteristics, the bridge was recognized as the longest in Russia and the second largest in Europe (the first one was in the Netherlands across the Lek River near Kuilenburg). Represented at the Exposition Universelle (1900), the Yenisei bridge's model received the Gold medal, while Proskouriakov himself went on to become one of the country's most prominent engineers. The bridge was subsequently approved by the UNESCO for inclusion in the World Heritage List.

The Yenisei bridge was ground-breaking for its time. Proskouriakov's statically determinate trusses with subdivided panels and upward-angled upper chords were subsequently widely used by many other bridge engineers. For example, such a system (with a few changeups) was borrowed by Prof. Nikolai Belelubsky in the design of the rail bridge across the Volga River near Sviyazhsk.

Proskouriakov managed to elaborate the most suitable types of spans for a variety of bridges. He designed many unique multi-span bridges, including the bridges over Oka near Kashira (1897), Belev (1897) and Murom (1912), Vyatka on the Cherepovets-Vologda-Vyatka line (1902), Volkhov (1902), Amur near Khabarovsk (1916) on the Trans-Siberian Railway and so forth.

Yevhen Paton compared Proskouriakov's bridges to Pushkin's poems.

In 1904, Proskouriakov designed two arched steel double track rail bridges — Andreyevsky and Krasnoluzhsky across the Moscow River for the Moscow Circular Railway. Both twin bridges were located within the city limits, and their graceful appearance fully satisfied the demands imposed to urban buildings at that period in time. It is worth noting that those bridges were first in Russia's railroad network that had crescent arch spans.

One more important achievement in bridge engineering of Imperial Russia was the famous Amur rail bridge near Khabarovsk that was also designed by Professor Proskouriakov. Opened for traffic on 5 October, 1916 the bridge marked the completion of Trans-Siberian Railroad.

Similar to the Yenisei bridge, the piers of the Amur bridge had massive buttresses pointing upstream and designed as inclined planes toward the current for the purpose of preventing ice from piling up against the piers. The height of the bridge from the upper deck to the maximum water surface elevation reached . It allowed larger ships to pass underneathl even at the highest summer water level in the Amur. The bridge cost the Russian treasury more than 13 million roubles that was an awful lot of money in that time.

Proskouriakov was a strong proponent of the graphical method (or the dummy load method) for truss analysis that was based on the theory of influence lines. In the period 1891-1892, Proskouriakov held practical classes on the application of graphical statics in civil engineering. It is particularly remarkable that two years later the course became a mandatory subject in the training programme for railway engineers.

In 1896, when designing the bridge across the Kotorosl River, Proskouriakov first introduced special tables used for the calculation of bearing strength (load-carrying capacity) for bridge builders. Both the theory of influence lines and the tables introduced by Proskouriakov eased a procedure of truss analysis. Since then, they have eventually become ingrained in bridge engineering practises around the world.

Education activities
Proskouriakov was also a prominent educator and mentor of youth. He trained many talented scientists and engineers. His colleagues and apprentices, such as E.O.Paton, M.M.Filonenko-Borodich, I.P.Prokofiev, P.A.Velikhov, P.Y.Kamentsev subsequently became nationally famous scientists. The educational principles of the engineering mechanics program developed by Prof. Proskouriakov are now widely used by higher education.

In 1902, Proskouriakov published his first volume of structural mechanics that was titled Strength of Materials. Later, in 1907, he also published the second volume, named Structural Statics, as well as his scientific work The Methods for the Analysis of Continuous Truss Bridges. Those works have been included into the golden fund of science. His two-volume handbook went through six editions during his lifetime. The seventh edition was published posthumously, and it has become a textbook for all technical institutes of the country.

See also
 Nikolai Belelubsky
 Ufa Rail Bridge
 List of civil engineers

References

Notes

External links and references
 "Pioneer of the Russian Bridge Science"

Russian inventors
Russian engineers
Bridge engineers
1858 births
1926 deaths